Interstate 80N  may refer to:

 Interstate 80N (Oregon–Utah), now Interstate 84 (Oregon–Utah)
 Interstate 80N (Iowa), became part of Interstate 680 from 1973 to 2019 and now Interstate 880 in 2019
 Interstate 80N (Ohio), now part of Interstates 90, 480, and 490
 Interstate 80N (Pennsylvania), now part of Interstate 78

80N
N